Seung-Eun Kim (Korean: 김승은) is a Korean-born American artist, director and animator. He is a three-time Emmy nominee, and three-time Annie Award nominee. Kim has worked in animation since 1996.

 Highlights of his career include:

 Godzilla animation, story board/clean-up artist, 1997
 Starship Troopers, story board artist, 1998
 Jackie Chan Adventures, story board artist and director, 1998
 The Spider-Man, director, 2000
 The Batman TV Series, director, 2003–2005, nominated for two Annie Awards and Three-times Emmy for best animated television production
 The Boondocks, supervising director, 2005–2008.

Kim has also directed/animated the main titles of:

Godzilla cartoon, 1997 and Jackie Chan Adventures, 1998

Kim's talents extend far beyond animation. He has done award-winning work in sculpture and comic book art, most notably work on the Hellboy: Weird Tales comic.

Most recently he worked on the television show The Boondocks, where his directing credits include the following episodes:
"The Story of Gangstalicious"
"A Huey Freeman Christmas"
"Let's Nab Oprah"
"Wingmen"
"...Or Die Trying"
"Tom, Sarah and Usher"
"Thank You for Not Snitching"
"Stinkmeaner Strikes Back"
"The Story of Thugnificent"
"Attack of the Killer Kung-Fu Wolf Bitch"
"The Story of Gangstalicious 2"
"The Uncle Ruckus Reality Show"

Kim's latest work includes a reimagining of the Sun Wukong Monkey King story called Battle Earth: Return of the Monkey King!.

References

External links

Official website
 

Living people
Korean television directors
1976 births